Garango is a department or commune of Boulgou Province in eastern Burkina Faso. Its capital is the town of Garango. According to the 2019 census the department has a total population of 91,158.

Towns and villages

 Garango (40 404 inhabitants) (capital)
 Bangoula (2 337 inhabitants) 
 Belgue (516 inhabitants) 
 Dissiam (3 019 inhabitants) 
 Gogoma (659 inhabitants) 
 Kombinatenga (1 201 inhabitants) 
 Lergho (3 830 inhabitants) 
 Ouaregou (9 090 inhabitants) 
 Ouaregou-Peulh (214 inhabitants) 
 Sanogho (4 537 inhabitants) 
 Sanogho-Peulh (165 inhabitants) 
 Siguinvousse (732 inhabitants) 
 Torla (3 526 inhabitants) 
 Zigla-Koulpele (4 476 inhabitants) 
 Zigla-Polace (2 966 inhabitants)

References

Departments of Burkina Faso
Boulgou Province